John Thomas Donovan (1878 – 17 January 1922) was an Irish barrister and nationalist politician who sat in the House of Commons from 1914 to 1918.

Born in Belfast, Donovan was called to the bar at the King's Inns in 1914.

He was elected as the Member of Parliament (MP) for West Wicklow at a by-election in August 1914, to fill the vacancy caused by the death of Edward Peter O'Kelly.
He did not defend his seat at the 1918 general election, when it was won by the Sinn Féin candidate.  He stood instead in South Donegal, where he was defeated by Sinn Féin's Peter J. Ward.

References

External links 
 
 

1878 births
1922 deaths
Members of the Parliament of the United Kingdom for County Wicklow constituencies (1801–1922)
UK MPs 1910–1918
Irish Parliamentary Party MPs
Irish barristers
Politicians from Belfast
Alumni of King's Inns